The Pursuit of Happiness is a 1988 Australian film directed by Martha Ansara.

In the mid 1980s Ansara was involved in the Australian anti-nuclear movement and wanted to make a film about Australia's relationship with the US. She originally intended to make a documentary but then it evolved into a dramatic feature about a married relationship that acted as a paradigm for the US-Australia relationship. Ansara:
It was a bit of a crude analysis, but it took so long to make (under the 10BA system) that by the time we finished the film - it was 1987 - for various reasons, the anti-nuclear movement was on the way out, so the film missed its time. And with films, timing is everything. If we had done it in a year, which we couldn't, it probably would have done very, very well. As it was, it did return 40 percent to the investors, but that was because it was very low-budget. The interesting thing about the film is that, if the audience was not very sophisticated, they liked it enormously. If they were sophisticated, they thought it was really daggy.

References

External links

The Pursuit of Happiness at Oz Movies

Australian drama films
1988 films
1980s English-language films
1980s Australian films